= Sundeep Fernandes =

Sundeep Fernandes is a UAE based comedian of Indian origin. He is known for turning everyday life into viral comedy inspiring over 2.1 million lives.

== Career ==
Sundeep worked in the corporate sector for over two decades in the field of procurement and project management before taking up content creation full-time. He used to be a toastmaster as well.

He is regularly engaged in comedy shows around the world with other artists.
